Ilias Sapanis (born 29 December 1973) is a Greek retired footballer.

Club career
Sapanis started his career from Naoussa F.C. in 1992. His brilliant performances transferred him to Olympiakos F.C. After 2.5 years, he moved to Iraklis Thessaloniki F.C., along with Takis Gonias as exchange for Georgios Anatolakis transfer. Sapanis scored two goals for Olympiakos at UEFA Cup. The first was against Sevilla  in a home 2-1 victory, and the second against Ferencváros in a 2-2 tie. Sapanis also played in Italy, with three teams. Sapanis played until age 38 with his birthplace club Doxa Pentalofos. His brother Miltiadis Sapanis is also footballer.

References

1973 births
Living people
Greek footballers
Greek expatriate footballers
Super League Greece players
Naoussa F.C. players
Iraklis Thessaloniki F.C. players
Olympiacos F.C. players
PAS Giannina F.C. players
Association football forwards
People from Thessaloniki (regional unit)
Footballers from Central Macedonia